The Nacra 5.2 is an American catamaran sailing dinghy that was designed by Tom Roland as a one-design racer and first built in 1975. Other that the small production run Nacra 36, the Nacra 5.2 was the first Nacra brand boat and established its reputation.

The Nacra 5.2 design was superseded by the Nacra 5.5 in the company's product line in 1979.

Production
The design was built by Nacra Sailing in the United States. A total of 2600 were built during its ten-year production run from 1975 until 1985, but it is now out of production.

Design
The Nacra 5.2 is a recreational sailboat, built predominantly of fiberglass. It has a fractional sloop rig with a rotating mast, anodized aluminum spars and nine full mainsail sail battens. The symmetrical hulls have plumb stems, reverse transoms, transom-hung fiberglass rudders controlled by a tiller and retractable fiberglass daggerboards. The boat displaces .

For sailing the design is equipped with trapezes to allow the crew to balance the boat. The design includes on-water adjustment controls for the shroud tensions, outhaul, jib luff and mainsail downhaul.

The design has a Portsmouth Yardstick racing average handicap of 72.0 and is normally raced with a crew of two sailors.

Operational history
In a 1994 review Richard Sherwood wrote, "the hulls are wide at the bottom and narrow at the top to create
extra buoyancy ... In spite of the high aspect ratio, the center of effort is low."

By 1994 there were racing fleets established in Australia, Europe, Japan and the United States.

See also
List of sailing boat types
List of multihulls

Similar sailboats
Hobie 17

References

Dinghies
Catamarans
1970s sailboat type designs
Sailboat types built by Nacra Sailing
Sailboat type designs by Tom Roland